Adrian Ungur was the defending champion but decided not to participate.
Gianluca Naso won the final against Andreas Haider-Maurer 6–4, 7–5.

Seeds

Draw

Finals

Top half

Bottom half

References
 Main Draw
 Qualifying Draw

Carisap Tennis Cup - Singles
2012 - Singles